7HD is an Australian television channel, owned by Seven West Media, originally launched on 15 October 2007 featuring unique breakaway programming from 10 December 2007 to 4 October 2009 and a HD simulcast of Seven until 25 September 2010. The channel is available to high definition digital television viewers in metropolitan areas through a number of owned-and-operated stations. On 25 September 2010, 7HD was replaced by the new channel 7mate.

7HD returned as a high definition simulcast on channel 70 on 10 May 2016. Initially, the Melbourne and Adelaide markets received 7HD as a HD simulcast of Seven's primary channel while the Sydney, Brisbane and Perth markets received 7HD as a HD simulcast of 7mate; this was to allow Australian Football League (AFL) matches to be broadcast in HD in those markets. Sydney, Brisbane and Perth temporarily received 7HD as a simulcast of the primary channel for the duration of the 2016 Summer Olympics, before the change was made permanent during and after the 2017 Australian Open tennis. Up until 16 January 2020, breakaway programming was used to show further AFL matches and Australian cricket matches in HD.

History

Origins
In 2004, after the 2001 introduction of digital terrestrial television in Australia, the Seven Network began a part-time high definition simulcast on digital channel 70 under the name 7 HD Digital. This simulcast showcased native high definition content alongside standard definition services on Seven. During the times that native high definition content was unavailable for simulcasting, a promo loop that showcased extracts from a variety of Seven's programs was broadcast.

Breakaway era
7HD was officially announced on 15 September 2007, with Seven West Media announcing their intention to start a high definition multichannel, that was initially expected to launch in December 2007. However, 7HD became the first free-to-air commercial television channel introduced to metropolitan areas since 1988, when it launched prior on 15 October 2007, with 25th Hour being the first program broadcast at 10:30 pm.

The channel replaced Seven's existing high definition service 7 HD Digital, a part-time simulcast of its standard definition and analogue services. Due to an amendment of the Broadcasting Services Act 1992 in 2006 – the Broadcasting Legislation Amendment (Digital television) Act 2006 – television networks were permitted to launch digital multichannels, provided that they are broadcast exclusively in high definition. The channel expanded its broadcast schedule on 10 December 2007 to include daytime programming which had previously been a full simulcast of the main channel. 7HD breakaway programming ceased transmission on Sunday 4 October 2009 in preparation for the launch of 7TWO a few weeks later on 1 November. 7HD then returned to being a full high definition simulcast of Seven, before finally being replaced by 7mate on 25 September 2010.

2016 revival
On 10 May 2016, 7HD returned as a high definition simulcast on channel 70. However, Melbourne and Adelaide were the only cities that received 7HD as a simulcast of Seven's primary channel on that date; Sydney, Brisbane and Perth received 7HD as a simulcast of 7mate. This is so that upcoming AFL matches can be shown in HD in all markets.

In order to allow the 2016 Summer Olympics to be broadcast in high definition in all capital cities, 7HD was temporarily changed to a simulcast of Seven's primary channel in Sydney, Brisbane and Perth on 5 August 2016. However, it was reverted to a 7mate simulcast in those markets on 22 August 2016, following the conclusion of the Olympics.

On 16 December 2016, 7HD switched from simulcasting 7mate to simulcasting Seven's primary channel in Sydney, Brisbane and Perth to allow the 2017 Australian Open tennis to be simulcast in high definition in all metropolitan markets. This change was not reverted and 7HD remained a simulcast of Seven in all capital cities. However, in order to broadcast AFL matches featured on 7mate in HD, Seven would use breakaway programming to show AFL matches in HD while keeping 7HD as a simulcast of Seven. In early 2020, following the relaunch of 7mate HD on Channel 74, 7HD continued broadcasting as a HD simulcast of the main Seven channel in all metropolitan markets.

Programming

During its time of breakaway broadcasting, 7HD broadcast a range of programming, with exclusive transmissions on weekday and weekend afternoons as well as late on weeknights, and for some time there was breakaway programming in prime-time on Saturdays and Sundays. Up to seven hours of exclusive programming was broadcast daily.

Weekday afternoon programming included repeats of locally produced lifestyle programming, such as The Great Outdoors, New Idea TV, as well as movies and Disney cartoons such as Kim Possible, American Dragon: Jake Long, and My Friends Tigger & Pooh. In the late evenings a mixture of exclusive series, movies and encore screenings of series were broadcast. Late-night series broadcast included This is Your Laugh, Lost, Scrubs, That '70s Show, The Grid, Urban Legends, Final 24, Dateline NBC, 5ive Days to Midnight, A Country Practice, and classic episodes of Deal or No Deal as well as late movies and encores of other series shown on Channel Seven.

The only two series exclusively made for 7HD were The NightCap and This is Your Laugh. The NightCap was broadcast exclusively on 7HD on Tuesdays and Thursdays at 10.30pm until its axing during the Easter non-ratings break of 2008.

Availability

Original channel
In its former inception, 7HD was available on Seven's owned-and-operated stations, ATN Sydney, HSV Melbourne, BTQ Brisbane, SAS Adelaide, TVW Perth and STQ Queensland. Regional affiliate Prime Television also carried their own HD simulcast, Prime HD, on its owned-and-operated stations, AMV Victoria, NEN Northern New South Wales and CBN Southern New South Wales/Australian Capital Territory. Southern Cross Television's Seven-affiliated stations carried their own HD simulcast, Southern Cross HD, on TNT Tasmania and TND Darwin.

Southern Cross' other stations GTS/BKN Spencer Gulf/Broken Hill and QQQ Eastern & Central Australia, as well as Golden West Network (owned by Prime) did not carry a HD simulcast.

Revival channel
Upon its revival on 10 May 2016, 7HD returned to 1080i high definition, but was broadcast in MPEG-4 format as opposed to the standard MPEG-2 format. Seven-owned stations and affiliates downgrade 7mate from HD to standard definition upon the launch of their respective main channel's HD simulcast.

7HD initially launched as a simulcast of Seven's primary channel in Melbourne and Adelaide only, with Sydney, Brisbane and Perth receiving a HD simulcast of 7mate. 7HD later became a simulcast of Seven's primary channel in Sydney, Brisbane and Perth with breakaway programming used to broadcast 7mate's AFL matches in HD. The Seven-owned STQ Queensland transmitters did not carry 7HD in any form until 26 November 2018, where it is currently available in MPEG-2 format.

Southern Cross Seven announced in March 2017 that its Seven affiliated station TNT Tasmania would have a high definition simulcast, Southern Cross HD, launched in time for the first match of the 2017 AFL season later that month. Although it began on 22 March of the same year, it only began broadcasting Channel 7 programming in native high definition from 19 June 2018.

Prime7 later re-launched its own high definition simulcast on its owned-and-operated stations branded Prime7 HD in Northern NSW, Southern NSW/ACT, regional Victoria and Mildura on 15 January 2018. Prime Media Group and its subsidiaries including Prime7 was acquired by Seven West Media on 31 December 2021. Since then, Prime7 HD began using a 7HD feed and eventually was rebranded 7HD on 8 June 2022.

Logo history

Slogans
2007–2009: The Difference is Clear
2016–2019: Gottaloveit
2019–2020: Only on 7
2020–present: Better Together

See also

List of digital television channels in Australia
High-definition television in Australia

References

External links
7 HD Digital Promo Loop 2004

Seven Network
Digital terrestrial television in Australia
English-language television stations in Australia
Television channels and stations established in 2007
Television channels and stations disestablished in 2010
Television channels and stations established in 2016
High-definition television